Faramerz Noshir Dabhoiwala (born 1969) is a historian and senior research scholar at Princeton University where he teaches and writes about the social history, cultural history, and intellectual history of the English-speaking world, from the Middle Ages to the present day.

Education 
Dabhoiwala was educated in Amsterdam, the University of York and the University of Oxford where he was awarded a Doctor of Philosophy degree in 1995; his thesis was on prostitution in London in the 17th century and 18th century.

Career 
Before moving to Princeton, he was a member of faculty at the University of Oxford, where he holds life fellowships of All Souls College, Oxford and Exeter College, Oxford.

His 2012 book, The Origins of Sex: A History of the First Sexual Revolution, examines the first sexual revolution and the history of human sexuality.   It was  book of the year at The Economist.

Personal life
Dabhoiwala is a Parsi. He has four children, two with the astrophysicist Jo Dunkley.

Publications

Articles
 Fara Dabhoiwala, "Imperial Delusions" (review of Priya Satia, Time's Monster: How History Makes History, Belknap Press/Harvard University Press, 2020, 363 pp.; Mahmood Mamdani, Neither Settler nor Native: The Making and Unmaking of Permanent Minorities, Belknap Press/Harvard University Press, 2020, 401 pp.; and Adom Getachew, Worldmaking after Empire: The Rise and Fall of Self-Determination, Princeton University Press, 2021 [?], 271 pp.), The New York Review of Books, vol. LXVIII, no. 11 (1 July 2021), pp. 59–62.

References 
 

21st-century American historians
1969 births
Living people
American people of Parsi descent
American Zoroastrians
Fellows of the Royal Historical Society
Alumni of the University of York
Alumni of the University of Oxford
Academics of the University of Oxford
Princeton University faculty
Fellows of All Souls College, Oxford
Fellows of Exeter College, Oxford
21st-century American male writers
American male non-fiction writers
Historians of sexuality